Motaher Hossain Chowdhury (1903 – 1956) was a Bengali writer, thinker and educationist. He was born in Noakhali of Bengal Presidency, British India in 1903. He died in Chittagong, East Pakistan, Pakistan in 1956.

Writing career
Chowdhury was a full-time writer and literature lover.  His literary works were included in the curriculum of school level, secondary, higher secondary and graduation level Bengali Literature in Bangladesh.

Special work
Sanskriti Katha

In "Sanskriti Katha", he wrote, "Religion is the culture of common folks and culture is the religion of educated, elegant people."

References

Golpo Songroho (Collected Stories), the national textbook of B.A. (pass and subsidiary) course of Bangladesh, published by University of Dhaka in 1979 (reprint in 1986).
Bangla Sahitya (Bengali Literature), the national textbook of intermediate (college) level of Bangladesh published in 1996 by all educational boards.

Motaher Hussain Chowdhury
Motaher Hussain Chowdhury
1903 births
1956 deaths
Academic staff of Chittagong College
People from Noakhali District